Harri Rehe (or Harry Rehe; 26 December 1930 – 3 February 2013) was an Estonian cinematographer.

He was born in Pärnu.

From 1960 to 1972 he worked at Tallinnfilm, and from 1972 to 1987 in Eesti Telefilm.

Selected filmography
 "Ühe küla mehed" (1961)
 "Roosa kübar" (1963) (short feature film)
 "Supernoova" (1965)
 "Tütarlaps mustas" (1966)
 "Viini postmark" (1967)
 "Kevade" (1969)
 "Metskapten" (1971)
 "Teatriöö" (1971) (musical film)
 "Noor pensionär" (1972) (short feature film)

References

External links
 Suri "Kevade" operaator Harry Rehe, delfi.ee, 3 February 2013

1930 births
2013 deaths
Estonian cinematographers
People from Pärnu